Queueing theory is the mathematical study of waiting lines, or queues. A queueing model is constructed so that queue lengths and waiting time can be predicted. Queueing theory is generally considered a branch of operations research because the results are often used when making business decisions about the resources needed to provide a service.

Queueing theory has its origins in research by Agner Krarup Erlang, who created models to describe the system of incoming calls at the Copenhagen Telephone Exchange Company. These ideas have since seen applications in telecommunication, traffic engineering, computing, project management, and particularly industrial engineering, where they are applied in the design of factories, shops, offices, and hospitals.

Spelling 

The spelling "queueing" over "queuing" is typically encountered in the academic research field. In fact, one of the flagship journals of the field is Queueing Systems.

Single queueing nodes 

A queue or queueing node can be thought of as nearly a black box. Jobs (also called customers or requests, depending on the field) arrive to the queue, possibly wait some time, take some time being processed, and then depart from the queue.

However, the queueing node is not quite a pure black box since some information is needed about the inside of the queuing node. The queue has one or more servers which can each be paired with an arriving job. When the job is completed and departs, that server will again be free to be paired with another arriving job.

An analogy often used is that of the cashier at a supermarket. (There are other models, but this one is commonly encountered in the literature.) Customers arrive, are processed by the cashier, and depart. Each cashier processes one customer at a time, and hence this is a queueing node with only one server. A setting where a customer will leave immediately if the cashier is busy when the customer arrives, is referred to as a queue with no buffer (or no waiting area). A setting with a waiting zone for up to n customers is called a queue with a buffer of size n.

Birth-death process 

The behaviour of a single queue (also called a queueing node) can be described by a birth–death process, which describes the arrivals and departures from the queue, along with the number of jobs currently in the system. If k denotes the number of jobs in the system (either being serviced or waiting if the queue has a buffer of waiting jobs), then an arrival increases k by 1 and a departure decreases k by 1.

The system transitions between values of k by "births" and "deaths", which occur at the arrival rates  and the departure rates  for each job . For a queue, these rates are generally considered not to vary with the number of jobs in the queue, so a single average rate of arrivals/departures per unit time is assumed.

Balance equations 

The steady state equations for the birth-and-death process, known as the balance equations, are as follows. Here  denotes the steady state probability to be in state n.

 
 
 

The first two equations imply
 
and
 .

By mathematical induction,
 .

The condition  leads to
 

Kendall's notation 

Single queueing nodes are usually described using Kendall's notation in the form A/S/c where A describes the distribution of durations between each arrival to the queue, S the distribution of service times for jobs, and c the number of servers at the node. For an example of the notation, the M/M/1 queue is a simple model where a single server serves jobs that arrive according to a Poisson process (where inter-arrival durations are exponentially distributed) and have exponentially distributed service times (the M denotes a Markov process). In an M/G/1 queue, the G stands for "general" and indicates an arbitrary probability distribution for service times.

Example analysis of an M/M/1 queue 

Consider a queue with one server and the following characteristics:
 : the arrival rate (the reciprocal of the expected time between each customer arriving, e.g. 10 customers per second)
 : the reciprocal of the mean service time (the expected number of consecutive service completions per the same unit time, e.g. per 30 seconds)
 n: the parameter characterizing the number of customers in the system
 : the probability of there being n customers in the system in steady state

Further, let  represent the number of times the system enters state n, and  represent the number of times the system leaves state n. Then  for all n. That is, the number of times the system leaves a state differs by at most 1 from the number of times it enters that state, since it will either return into that state at some time in the future or not.

When the system arrives at a steady state, the arrival rate should be equal to the departure rate.

Thus the balance equations
 
 
 
imply
 
The fact that  leads to the geometric distribution formula
 
where .

Simple two-equation queue 

A common basic queuing system is attributed to Erlang and is a modification of Little's Law. Given an arrival rate λ, a dropout rate σ, and a departure rate μ, length of the queue L is defined as:

 .

Assuming an exponential distribution for the rates, the waiting time W can be defined as the proportion of arrivals that are served. This is equal to the exponential survival rate of those who do not drop out over the waiting period, giving:

 

The second equation is commonly rewritten as:

 

The two-stage one-box model is common in epidemiology.

History 

In 1909, Agner Krarup Erlang, a Danish engineer who worked for the Copenhagen Telephone Exchange, published the first paper on what would now be called queueing theory. He modeled the number of telephone calls arriving at an exchange by a Poisson process and solved the M/D/1 queue in 1917 and M/D/k queueing model in 1920. In Kendall's notation:

 M stands for "Markov" or "memoryless", and means arrivals occur according to a Poisson process
 D stands for "deterministic", and means jobs arriving at the queue require a fixed amount of service
 k describes the number of servers at the queueing node (k = 1, 2, 3, ...)

If the node has more jobs than servers, then jobs will queue and wait for service.

The M/G/1 queue was solved by Felix Pollaczek in 1930, a solution later recast in probabilistic terms by Aleksandr Khinchin and now known as the Pollaczek–Khinchine formula.

After the 1940s, queueing theory became an area of research interest to mathematicians. In 1953, David George Kendall solved the GI/M/k queue and introduced the modern notation for queues, now known as Kendall's notation. In 1957, Pollaczek studied the GI/G/1 using an integral equation. John Kingman gave a formula for the mean waiting time in a G/G/1 queue, now known as Kingman's formula.

Leonard Kleinrock worked on the application of queueing theory to message switching in the early 1960s and packet switching in the early 1970s. His initial contribution to this field was his doctoral thesis at the Massachusetts Institute of Technology in 1962, published in book form in 1964. His theoretical work published in the early 1970s underpinned the use of packet switching in the ARPANET, a forerunner to the Internet.

The matrix geometric method and matrix analytic methods have allowed queues with phase-type distributed inter-arrival and service time distributions to be considered.

Systems with coupled orbits are an important part in queueing theory in the application to wireless networks and signal processing.  

Problems such as performance metrics for the M/G/k queue remain an open problem.

Service disciplines 

Various scheduling policies can be used at queuing nodes:

 First in, first out Also called first-come, first-served (FCFS), this principle states that customers are served one at a time and that the customer that has been waiting the longest is served first.

 Last in, first out This principle also serves customers one at a time, but the customer with the shortest waiting time will be served first. Also known as a stack.

 Processor sharing Service capacity is shared equally between customers.

 Priority Customers with high priority are served first. Priority queues can be of two types: non-preemptive (where a job in service cannot be interrupted) and preemptive (where a job in service can be interrupted by a higher-priority job). No work is lost in either model.

 Shortest job first The next job to be served is the one with the smallest size.

 Preemptive shortest job first The next job to be served is the one with the smallest original size.

 Shortest remaining processing time The next job to serve is the one with the smallest remaining processing requirement.

 Service facility
 Single server: customers line up and there is only one server
 Several parallel servers (single queue): customers line up and there are several servers
 Several parallel servers (several queues): there are many counters and customers can decide for which to queue

 Unreliable server

Server failures occur according to a stochastic (random) process (usually Poisson) and are followed by setup periods during which the server is unavailable. The interrupted customer remains in the service area until server is fixed. 

 Customer waiting behavior
 Balking: customers decide not to join the queue if it is too long
 Jockeying: customers switch between queues if they think they will get served faster by doing so
 Reneging: customers leave the queue if they have waited too long for service

Arriving customers not served (either due to the queue having no buffer, or due to balking or reneging by the customer) are also known as dropouts. The average rate of dropouts is a significant parameter describing a queue.

Queueing networks 

Queue networks are systems in which multiple queues are connected by customer routing. When a customer is serviced at one node, it can join another node and queue for service, or leave the network.

For networks of m nodes, the state of the system can be described by an m–dimensional vector (x1, x2, ..., xm) where xi represents the number of customers at each node.

The simplest non-trivial networks of queues are called tandem queues. The first significant results in this area were Jackson networks, for which an efficient product-form stationary distribution exists and the mean value analysis (which allows average metrics such as throughput and sojourn times) can be computed. If the total number of customers in the network remains constant, the network is called a closed network and has been shown to also have a product–form stationary distribution by the Gordon–Newell theorem. This result was extended to the BCMP network, where a network with very general service time, regimes, and customer routing is shown to also exhibit a product–form stationary distribution. The normalizing constant can be calculated with the Buzen's algorithm, proposed in 1973.

Networks of customers have also been investigated, such as Kelly networks, where customers of different classes experience different priority levels at different service nodes. Another type of network are G-networks, first proposed by Erol Gelenbe in 1993: these networks do not assume exponential time distributions like the classic Jackson network.

Routing algorithms 

In discrete-time networks where there is a constraint on which service nodes can be active at any time, the max-weight scheduling algorithm chooses a service policy to give optimal throughput in the case that each job visits only a single-person service node. In the more general case where jobs can visit more than one node, backpressure routing gives optimal throughput. A network scheduler must choose a queueing algorithm, which affects the characteristics of the larger network.

Mean-field limits 

Mean-field models consider the limiting behaviour of the empirical measure (proportion of queues in different states) as the number of queues m approaches infinity. The impact of other queues on any given queue in the network is approximated by a differential equation. The deterministic model converges to the same stationary distribution as the original model.

Heavy traffic/diffusion approximations 

In a system with high occupancy rates (utilisation near 1), a heavy traffic approximation can be used to approximate the queueing length process by a reflected Brownian motion, Ornstein–Uhlenbeck process, or more general diffusion process. The number of dimensions of the Brownian process is equal to the number of queueing nodes, with the diffusion restricted to the non-negative orthant.

Fluid limits 

Fluid models are continuous deterministic analogs of queueing networks obtained by taking the limit when the process is scaled in time and space, allowing heterogeneous objects. This scaled trajectory converges to a deterministic equation which allows the stability of the system to be proven. It is known that a queueing network can be stable but have an unstable fluid limit.

See also 

 Ehrenfest model
 Erlang unit
 Network simulation
 Project production management
 Queue area
 Queueing delay
 Queue management system
 Queuing Rule of Thumb
 Random early detection
 Renewal theory
 Throughput
 Scheduling (computing)
 Traffic jam
 Traffic generation model
 Flow network

References

Further reading 
  Online
 
  chap.15, pp. 380–412
 
 
 Leonard Kleinrock, Information Flow in Large Communication Nets, (MIT, Cambridge, May 31, 1961) Proposal for a Ph.D. Thesis
 Leonard Kleinrock. Information Flow in Large Communication Nets (RLE Quarterly Progress Report, July 1961)
 Leonard Kleinrock. Communication Nets: Stochastic Message Flow and Delay (McGraw-Hill, New York, 1964)

External links 

 Queueing theory calculator
 Teknomo's Queueing theory tutorial and calculators
 
 Virtamo's Queueing Theory Course
 Myron Hlynka's Queueing Theory Page
Queueing Theory Basics
 A free online tool to solve some classical queueing systems
 JMT: an open source graphical environment for queueing theory
 LINE: a general-purpose engine to solve queueing models
 What You Hate Most About Waiting in Line: (It’s not the length of the wait.), by Seth Stevenson, Slate, 2012 – popular introduction

 
Stochastic processes
Production planning
Customer experience
Operations research
Formal sciences
Rationing
Network performance
Markov models
Markov processes